In mathematics, specifically ring theory, a left primitive ideal is the annihilator of a (nonzero) simple left module. A right primitive ideal is defined similarly. Left and right primitive ideals are always two-sided ideals.

Primitive ideals are prime. The quotient of a ring by a left primitive ideal is a left primitive ring. For commutative rings the primitive ideals are maximal, and so commutative primitive rings are all fields.

Primitive spectrum 

The primitive spectrum of a ring is a non-commutative analog of the prime spectrum of a commutative ring.

Now, suppose A is an associative algebra over a field. Then, by definition, a primitive ideal is the kernel of an irreducible representation  of A and thus there is a surjection
 

Example: the spectrum of a unital C*-algebra.

See also 
 
 Dixmier mapping

Notes

References

External links 

Ideals (ring theory)
Module theory